The 1999 Liga Perdana 1 season is the second season of Liga Perdana 1. A total of 10 teams participated in the season.

Terengganu was promoted from Liga Perdana 2 to a now reduced total number of teams competing in the league from 12 to only ten teams.

The season kicked off on March 20, 1999. Pahang dominated the season and ended up winning the title.

Teams

10 teams competing in the second season of Liga Perdana 1. Terengganu was promoted while Selangor, Perlis and Olympic 2000 were relegated to Liga Perdana 2.

 Pahang (1999 Liga Perdana 1 champions)
 Penang
 Negeri Sembilan
 Sabah
 Kuala Lumpur
 Sarawak
 Brunei
 Terengganu
 Perak
 Kedah (Relegated to Liga Perdana 2)

League Table:-

1.Pahang  - 34 PTS (1999 Liga Perdana 1 Champions)

2.Penang  - 31 PTS 

3.Negeri Sembilan  - 29 PTS

4.Sabah  - 29 PTS

5.Kuala Lumpur  - 28 PTS

6.Sarawak  - 27 PTS

7.Brunei  - 25 PTS

8.Terengganu  - 23 PTS

9.Perak  - 23 PTS

10.Kedah  - 21 PTS  (Relegated to Liga Perdana 2)

Champions

References

Liga Perdana 1 seasons
1
Malaysia